The Action for Renewal of Chad is a political party in Chad. 
In the legislative elections, 2011, the party won one seat.

References

Political parties in Chad